Kurt Hinze (born 13 October 1934) is a German biathlete. He competed in the 20 km individual event at the 1960 Winter Olympics.

References

External links
 

1934 births
Living people
German male biathletes
Olympic biathletes of the United Team of Germany
Biathletes at the 1960 Winter Olympics
People from Oberharz am Brocken
Sportspeople from Saxony-Anhalt